Clyde Conner (May 18, 1933 – December 12, 2011) was a professional American football player who played wide receiver for eight seasons for the San Francisco 49ers. Conner played basketball for the University of the Pacific.

1933 births
2011 deaths
People from Tuttle, Oklahoma
American football wide receivers
Pacific Tigers football players
Pacific Tigers men's basketball players
San Francisco 49ers players
American men's basketball players